Yeşildirek Spor Kulübü, is a Turkish football club from the Yeşildirek neighbourhood located in the Fatih district of Istanbul, Turkey. Homeground of the club is the Fatih Mimar Sinan Stadium, which has a capacity of 1,250. The club colors are yellow and green.

League participations
 Turkish Super League: 1961–63
 TFF First League: 1963–65
 TFF Second League*: 1970–72, 1984–87
 Amatör Futbol Ligleri: 1951-61, 1987-

*Note: Between the 1980-81 and 1983-84 seasons there was no TFF Second League

References 

Football clubs in Istanbul
Sport in Fatih
Association football clubs established in 1951
1951 establishments in Turkey
Süper Lig clubs